Róbinson Zapata Montaño (born 30 September 1978), is a Colombian football player.

Club career

Colombia
Zapata started his career in Colombia with América de Cali and Real Cartagena. In 2004, he moved to Argentina where he had spells with Rosario Central, Independiente and Belgrano. In 2006, he joined La Serena in Chile before returning to Colombia to play for Cúcuta Deportivo.

Steaua București
Rufay, as he is called by his colleagues, joined Steaua
on 23 July 2007 Steaua for €500.000 and signed a four-year contract with the Romanian team from Cúcuta Deportivo.
During the first half of the season, he became the most appreciated player in the Romanian team. (seen in this statistic made by Steaua supporters). After a mediocre second year at Steaua, Rufay became the first option as a goalkeeper after Ciprian Tătăruşanu's mistakes, and showed outstanding form.

In the beginning of 2010–11 season, Rufay was demoted to the B squad after the arrival of new coach Victor Piţurcă. Soon after Piţurcă left the club, new coach Dumitrescu called him back to the first squad. In December 2010, Zapata ended the contract with Steaua.

Galatasaray
On 21 January 2011, Zapata agreed a one-and-a-half-year deal with Turkish club Galatasaray.
He has been in a bad shape since his arrival, with just two clean sheets in 13 games, with a shot/save ratio of 42%. In June 2011, Robinson Zapata was fired from Galatasaray, becoming a free agent. He returned to Colombia where he played for Deportivo Pereira in the second half of 2011.

International career
On 5 July 2007, Zapata represented Colombia at the 2007 Copa América, playing against USA, but he was sent off in the 86th minute after being cautioned twice. His next tournament call-up came 9 years later, ahead of the Copa América Centenario.

Honours
América de Cali
Categoría Primera A (1): 2000

Cúcuta Deportivo
Categoría Primera A (1): 2006–II

Santa Fe
Categoría Primera A (2): 2014–II, 2016–II
Copa Sudamericana (1): 2015
Superliga Colombiana (1): 2015
Suruga Bank Championship (1): 2016

Colombia
Copa América: Third place 2016

References

External links
 Official FCSB profile  
 
 Argentine Primera statistics at Fútbol XXI  
 
 

1978 births
Living people
Sportspeople from Valle del Cauca Department
Colombian footballers
Association football goalkeepers
Colombia international footballers
Categoría Primera A players
Liga I players
Süper Lig players
América de Cali footballers
Real Cartagena footballers
Rosario Central footballers
Club Atlético Independiente footballers
Club Atlético Belgrano footballers
Deportes La Serena footballers
Cúcuta Deportivo footballers
FC Steaua București players
FC Steaua II București players
Galatasaray S.K. footballers
Deportivo Pereira footballers
Águilas Doradas Rionegro players
Millonarios F.C. players
Independiente Santa Fe footballers
Jaguares de Córdoba footballers
Colombian expatriate footballers
Expatriate footballers in Romania
Expatriate footballers in Chile
Expatriate footballers in Argentina
Expatriate footballers in Turkey
Colombian expatriate sportspeople in Romania
Colombian expatriate sportspeople in Chile
Colombian expatriate sportspeople in Argentina
Colombian expatriate sportspeople in Turkey
2007 Copa América players
Copa América Centenario players
Colombian people of African descent